Panagropsis is a monotypic moth genus in the family Geometridae described by Warren in 1894. Its only species, Panagropsis equitaria, described by Francis Walker in 1861, is found in South Africa.

References

Endemic moths of South Africa
Desmobathrinae